Gohain Kamal Ali was a road that connected the capital of the Koch dynasty, Cooch Behar in North Bengal to heart of Agomani in Dhubri and Narayanpur in Lakhimpur district in Assam.  This was constructed under the supervision of Gohain Kamal, the step-brother of the king, Nara Narayan and was completed in 1547. This was the road that the Koch general Chilarai used soon after for his invasion of the Ahom kingdom, and attacked the Ahom fort at Pichala, which was not a success, but a later movement in 1562 was greatly successful.

This road has also been of historical significance because it formed the boundary between the tribal region to the north of it and the orthodox region to the south of it. In 1562 Naranarayan encamped at Chandikabehar, Mangaldai, he demarcated the region north of the road as where the Koch and the Mech people were to follow their tribal customs, and region south where Brahminic rites were to be followed.  In later years, this road formed the southern boundary of the Assam Duars that formed a buffer zone between the political powers in the plains of Brahmaputra valley and the hills of Bhutan.

Ahom King Gaurinath Singha had fixed this road as the northern boundary of Darrang. The Kingdom of Bhutan controlled the Duars of  Koch Hajo and Koch Behar north of Gohain Kamal Ali till the Duar Wars in 1865 when British East India company removed Bhutanese influence from the Duars under the  Treaty of Sinchula and the areas were later added to Goalpara, Kamrup, Darrang districts of Assam and to Jalpaiguri district of Bengal respectively.

Notes

References
 
 
 
 
 </ref>

History of Assam